The 1976 Seattle Seahawks season was the team's first season competing in the National Football League (NFL). The 1976 season was the team's only one in the NFC until the league realigned divisions before the 2002 season, at which point the Seahawks were once again placed in the NFC West. The Seahawks obtained a future Pro Football Hall of Fame inductee from the Houston Oilers, who had drafted receiver Steve Largent in the 4th round in 1976. Largent would go on to be a first-ballot Hall-of-Fame wide receiver, playing in seven Pro Bowls, recorded over 13,000 receiving yards and score 100 touchdowns in a 14-year career with the Seahawks.

However, before the Seahawks even played their first game, tragedy struck, as the team's owner Lloyd W. Nordstrom died from a heart attack while vacationing in Mexico on January 20. Nordstrom had been instrumental in landing an NFL team in the Pacific Northwest, and hiring the front office, but he never had a chance to see his team take the field. The Seahawks, coached by Jack Patera, played their first preseason game against the San Francisco 49ers on August 1, and their first regular season game came on September 12 at the sold-out Kingdome. The Seahawks played a solid game, but had their desperation final pass intercepted in the endzone in a 30–24 loss to the St. Louis Cardinals. The Seahawks would go on to lose their first five games, before beating the Tampa Bay Buccaneers, their brothers in expansion, 13–10 in Tampa on October 17. Three weeks later, the Seahawks would earn their first (and only for that season) home victory by beating the Atlanta Falcons 30–13 behind the 124-yard effort of running back Sherman Smith. These two wins would be the only ones for the season, as the first-year team compiled a record of 2–12, making them the worst team in the NFC, although this was nevertheless better than their expansion cousins the Tampa Bay Buccaneers, who went 0-14 in the AFC.

1976 draft class

Personnel

Staff

Final roster
{{NFL final roster
|Year=1976
|TeamName=Seattle Seahawks
|offseason=no
|ufa=no
|rfa=no
|erfa=no
|Active=52
|Inactive=0
|PS=0

|Quarterbacks=

|Running Backs=

 FB

 FB|Wide Receivers=

|Tight Ends=

|Offensive Linemen= T G/T
 T
 C G
 C
 G
 G
 T

|Defensive Linemen=
 DT
 DE/DT
 DT DE
 DT DE
 DE
 DT

|Linebackers=

|Defensive Backs=

 S S
 CB CB

|Special Teams=
 K
 PR
 P
 K
 KR

|Reserve Lists=

|Practice Squad=
}}
     Starters in bold.

Schedule

Preseason

Source: Seahawks Media Guides1977 Seahawks Media Guide, accessed February 14, 2015.

Regular season
In its first year, Seattle played all of the teams in the NFC, plus fellow expansion team Tampa Bay, as a member of the NFC West.Bold' indicates division opponents.
Source: 1976 NFL season results

Standings

Game summaries

Preseason

Week P1: vs. San Francisco 49ers

Week P2: vs. Chicago Bears

Week P3: vs. Los Angeles Rams

Week P4: at Denver Broncos

Week P5: vs. San Diego Chargers

Week P6: at Oakland Raiders

Regular season

Week 1: vs. St. Louis Cardinals

The Seahawks played their first game in team history on September 12, 1976, hosting the St. Louis Cardinals at the Kingdome in Seattle, Washington.  The Cardinals took a 3–0 lead after Jim Bakken kicked a 28-yard field goal, however, the Seahawks fought back and Don Bitterlich kicked a 27-yard field goal to earn the first points in team history, and to tie the game at 3–3.  St. Louis took a 10–3 lead in the second quarter, as Ike Harris caught a 12-yard touchdown pass from Jim Hart.  The Cardinals then kicked another field goal to take a 13–3 lead into halftime.  St. Louis stayed hot in the third quarter, as Pat Tilley caught a 27-yard pass for a touchdown, followed by another field goal by Jim Bakken, as St. Louis took a commanding 23–3 lead.  The Seahawks cut into the lead late in the third quarter, as Sam McCullum scored the first touchdown in team history, completing a 15-yard pass from Jim Zorn, as Seattle narrowed the Cardinals lead to 23–10.  In the fourth quarter, Cardinals running back Jim Otis scored a one-yard touchdown, as St. Louis took a 30–10 lead.  The Seahawks made a late charge in the fourth quarter, as McCullum scored his second touchdown of the game, completing a 72-yard pass from Zorn, to make the score 30–17.  Later in the quarter, Zorn had an eight-yard rushing touchdown, as the Seahawks cut the Cardinals lead down to six, 30–24, however, it would be too late, as the Cardinals hung on for the victory.

With the loss, the Seahawks began the season 0–1–0.

Week 2: at Washington Redskins

The Seahawks played their first ever road game in week two, as they traveled across the country to Washington, D.C. to face the Washington Redskins.  Washington opened the season with a 19–17 win over the New York Giants in the first week of the season.  The Redskins opened the scoring in the first quarter, as Mike Thomas rushed for five yards into the Seahawks' end zone to give Washington a 7–0 lead.  In the second quarter, Redskins kicker Mark Moseley kicked a 37-yard field goal to make the score 10–0.  Jean Fugett then completed a 12-yard pass from Billy Kilmer to give the Redskins a 17–0 lead heading into halftime.  In the third quarter, Mike Thomas earned his second touchdown of the game, as he caught a 10-yard pass from Kilmer to increase the Redskins lead to 24–0.  The Seahawks got on the board in the fourth quarter, as Don Testerman rushed one yard into the end zone to cut Washington's lead to 24–7, however, the Redskins Frank Grant caught a five-yard pass from Kilmer, as Washington won the game easily by a 31–7 score.

Seattle fell to 0–2–0 with the loss.

Week 3: vs. San Francisco 49ers

The Seahawks returned home for the third week of the season, as they faced the San Francisco 49ers, who had a 1–1–0 record during their first two games.  The 49ers took control of the game early, as in the first quarter, kicker Steve Mike-Mayer had a 45-yard field goal to give San Francisco a 3–0 lead.  The Niners then took a 10–0 lead when Ralph McGill ran back a 50-yard punt return.  Gene Washington completed a 38-yard pass from quarterback Jim Plunkett to give the 49ers a 17–0 lead in the first quarter.  The Seahawks Hugh McKinnis had a one-yard rush into the 49ers' end zone to cut San Francisco's lead to 17–7 at the end of the quarter.  The 49ers took a 24–7 lead when Washington caught his second touchdown completion of the game in the second quarter, followed by a 52-yard touchdown completion by Willie McGee as San Francisco had a 31–7 lead going into halftime.  In the third quarter, McKinnis rushed for his second touchdown of the game to cut the 49ers lead to 31–14. In the fourth quarter, Seattle continued to come back, as Steve Largent caught a six-yard touchdown pass from Jim Zorn to make the score 31–21.  The 49ers Steve Mike-Mayer then kicked two late field goals in the game, as San Francisco won 37–21.

The loss dropped the Seahawks to 0–3–0.

Week 4: vs. Dallas Cowboys

The Dallas Cowboys came into the Kingdome for the Seahawks fourth game of the season.  Dallas had a record of 3–0 to begin the year.  The Seahawks took the lead in the game for the first time in team history in the first quarter when Don Testerman caught a seven-yard touchdown completion from Jim Zorn to give Seattle a 7–0 lead on the undefeated Cowboys.  In the second quarter, the Seahawks continued to stun the Cowboys, as Jim Zorn threw his second touchdown completion, this time a four-yard pass to Steve Largent, however, the extra point convert failed, as Seattle took a 13–0 lead.  The Cowboys began to comeback, as Drew Pearson caught an eight-yard pass from Roger Staubach for a touchdown to cut the Seahawks lead to 13–7.  Dallas then took a 14–13 lead into halftime, as Charley Young caught a 25-yard pass by Staubach for a touchdown at the end of the quarter.  The Cowboys scored another touchdown in the third quarter, as Robert Newhouse rushed for 24 yards into the Seahawks' end zone.  Dallas put the game out of reach in the fourth quarter, scoring their fourth touchdown in a row when Doug Dennison had a one-yard run, as the Cowboys won the game 28–13.

With the loss, the Seahawks record dropped to 0–4–0.

Week 5: at Green Bay Packers

After two home games in a row, the Seahawks were back on the road for the fifth week of the season, as they visited the Green Bay Packers at County Stadium in Milwaukee, Wisconsin.  The Packers entered the game with a 1–3–0 record.  Green Bay opened the scoring in the first quarter, when Barty Smith rushed for a yard into the Seahawks' end zone to give the Packers a 7–0 lead.  The Seahawks responded with a big second quarter, as Steve Raible ran back a 26-yard blocked punt return for a touchdown to even the score at 7–7.  The Seahawks took a 10–7 lead as John Leypoldt kicked a 48-yard field goal.  Leypoldt kicked a second field goal, a 44-yard kick, to give Seattle a 13–7 lead into halftime.  In the third quarter, the Seahawks took a 20–7 lead when Ralph Nelson ran for a one-yard touchdown.  The Packers cut the lead to 20–14 when Steve Odom caught a 66-yard pass from Lynn Dickey to close out the third quarter.  In the fourth, the Packers took a 21–20 lead when Barty Smith ran for a six-yard touchdown.  Green Bay scored another touchdown, this time a six-yard rush by Willard Harrell, however, the extra point failed, as the Packers took the lead 27–20, and hung on to win the game.

With the loss, the Seahawks dropped to 0–5–0.

Week 6: at Tampa Bay Buccaneers

The Seahawks remained on the road for the sixth week of the season, traveling to Tampa, Florida to face their expansion cousins, the Tampa Bay Buccaneers.  The Buccaneers entered the game with a 0–5–0 record.  Tampa Bay opened the scoring in the first quarter, when kicker Dave Green connected for a 38-yard field goal to give the Buccaneers a 3–0 lead.  In the second quarter, the Seahawks took the lead when Sam McCullum caught a 15-yard pass from Jim Zorn to give the Seahawks a 7–3 lead.  Before the quarter was over, Seahawks kicker John Leypoldt had two field goals, to give Seattle a 13–3 lead at halftime.  In the third quarter, the Buccaneers cut the Seahawks lead down to three when Morris Owens caught a one-yard pass from Louis Carter to make it 13–10 for the Seahawks.  In the fourth quarter, the Seahawks held off the Buccaneers, as Seattle held on for the win, the first in team history.

With the win, the Seahawks improved their record to 1–5–0.

Week 7: vs. Detroit Lions

The Seahawks returned home after two consecutive road games, and faced the Detroit Lions, who had a 2–4–0 record in their first six games of the season.  The Lions opened the scoring in the first quarter when kicker Benny Ricardo had a 25-yard field goal.  Ricardo then kicked a 44-yard field goal to give Detroit a 6–0 lead.  The Lions then took a 13–0 lead when David Hill caught a 20-yard pass for a touchdown from quarterback Greg Landry at the end of the first quarter.  The Lions stretched their lead to 20–0 when Levi Johnson intercepted a pass from Seahawks quarterback Jim Zorn and ran it back 70 yards into the Seahawks' end zone in the second quarter.  Seattle cut into the Lions lead when Hugh McKinnis rushed for a two-yard touchdown, to make the score 20–7 for Detroit.  Before halftime, McKinnis ran for another touchdown, this time a seven-yard run, to make the score 20–14.  The Lions took control of the game in the third quarter when Charlie Sanders caught an eight-yard pass for a touchdown to give the Lions a 27–14 lead.  Lawrence Gaines then caught a nine-yard pass for a touchdown as Detroit took a 34–14 lead.  In the fourth quarter, the Lions Lem Barney had a 24-yard interception and ran it back for a touchdown, as the Lions won the game 41–14.  Jim Zorn threw six interceptions in the game, and in total, the Seahawks had eight turnovers.

With the loss, the Seahawks record dropped to 1–6–0.

Week 8: at Los Angeles Rams

The Seahawks headed back on the road for the eighth week of the season, traveling to Los Angeles to face the NFC West Division leading Los Angeles Rams, who entered the game with a 5–1–1 record.  The Rams opened the scoring in the first quarter, when Tom Dempsey kicked a 20-yard field goal to make it 3–0 Los Angeles.  The Rams then took a 10–0 lead when Monte Jackson had a 41-yard interception for a touchdown from Seahawks quarterback Jim Zorn.  Los Angeles took a 17–0 lead when Lawrence McCutcheon had a six-yard rushing touchdown, followed by a touchdown by Ron Jessie as he caught a 15-yard pass from James Harris, giving the Rams a 24–0 lead after the first quarter.  The Seahawks broke the shutout in the second quarter, when John Leypoldt was good on a 43-yard field goal attempt to cut the Rams lead to 24–3.  Los Angeles took a 31–3 lead into halftime after Harold Jackson caught a 30-yard pass from Harris.  In the third quarter, John Leypoldt connected for his second field goal of the game for the Seahawks, making the score 31–6 for the Rams.  Los Angeles took a 38–6 lead in the fourth quarter when Rob Scribner rushed for a yard into the Seahawks' end zone.  The Rams capped off the scoring when Tom Geredine caught a pass from Pat Haden, giving the Rams the victory by a score of 45–6.

With the loss, the Seahawks record fell to 1–7–0.

Week 9: vs. Atlanta Falcons

The Seahawks returned to Seattle for their ninth game of the season, as they hosted the Atlanta Falcons, who entered the game with a 2–6–0 record.  After a scoreless first quarter, the Falcons opened the scoring in the second, when kicker Nick Mike-Mayer was successful on an 18-yard attempt to give Atlanta a 3–0 lead.  The Seahawks responded when Sherman Smith caught a 21-yard touchdown pass from Jim Zorn, as Seattle took a 7–3 lead.  The Seahawks upped their lead to 14–3 by halftime, when John McMakin had a 31-yard touchdown reception.  In the third quarter, Seahawks cornerback Dave Brown tackled the Falcons Rolland Lawrence in the Falcons' end zone for a safety, giving Seattle a 16–3 lead.  Nick Mike-Mayer of the Falcons kicked his second field goal of the game later in the quarter to cut the Seahawks lead to 16–6, however, Al Matthews of the Seahawks intercepted a pass from Falcons quarterback Kim McQuilken and ran it 40 yards into the Falcons' end zone, giving the Seahawks a 23–6 lead.  Before the end of the third quarter, the Seahawks added another touchdown when Sherman Smith had a 53-yard rush, as Seattle took a 30–6 lead.  Alfred Jenkins of the Falcons scored a touchdown in the fourth quarter, however, the Seahawks won the game 30–13 for their first ever victory at the Kingdome.

With the win, Seattle improved to 2–7–0.

Week 10: at Minnesota Vikings

The Seahawks were on the road for their tenth game of the season, as they headed to Metropolitan Stadium in Bloomington, Minnesota to face the Minnesota Vikings.  It was a very cold day, as the temperature at kickoff was 24 degrees, 16 with the windchill.  Heading into the game, the Vikings had a 7–1–1 record.  Minnesota took a 7–0 lead in the first quarter when Brent McClanahan rushed for a yard into the Seahawks' end zone.  Seattle responded and tied the game at 7–7 when quarterback Jim Zorn rushed 12 yards into the Vikings' end zone.  Minnesota re-took the lead in the second quarter when Sammy White caught a 29-yard pass for a touchdown from Fran Tarkenton, giving the Vikings a 14–7 into halftime.  Seattle tied the game early in the third quarter, when Jim Zorn threw an 80-yard pass to Steve Raible, making the score 14–14.  Vikings kicker Fred Cox broke the tie with a 43-yard field goal to give Minnesota a 17–14 lead, and then connected on a 39-yard attempt before the end of the quarter as the Vikings led the game 20–14.  Seattle took their first lead of the game in the fourth quarter when Sam McCullum caught a seven-yard pass from Zorn, as the Seahawks took the lead 21–20.  The Vikings avoided the upset though, as Stu Voigt caught a five-yard pass from Tarkenton, giving the Vikings the victory by a score of 27–21.

With the loss, Seattle fell to 2–8–0.

Week 11: vs. New Orleans Saints

The Seahawks returned to the Kingdome for the eleventh week of the season, where they hosted the New Orleans Saints, who came into the game with a 3–7–0 record.  Seattle opened the scoring when Sherman Smith had a one-yard rush into the Saints' end zone, however, the extra point failed, as the Seahawks had a 6–0 lead.  New Orleans cut the Seahawks lead in half when kicker Rich Szaro had a 46-yard field goal, making the score 6–3 for Seattle.  The Saints took full control of the game in the second quarter, as Bobby Douglass had two rushing touchdowns, followed by another field goal by Szaro, as the Saints scored 17 unanswered points to take a 20–6 lead.  New Orleans kept coming on strong in the third quarter, as Chuck Muncie had a three-yard rushing touchdown to make it 27–6 for the Saints.  Seattle cut into the Saints lead when Steve Largent caught an 11-yard pass from quarterback Bill Munson, making the score 27–13 for New Orleans.  The Saints responded with three touchdowns before the end of the quarter, two of them on Seahawks turnovers.  The Saints Tom Myers returned a 20-yard fumble into the Seattle end zone to make the score 34–13 for New Orleans.  Elex Price then had a 23-yard interception return for a touchdown to give the Saints a 41–13 lead, followed by a Tony Galbreath three-yard run into the Seahawks' end zone to give New Orleans a 48–13 lead after three-quarters.  In the fourth, the Seahawks Sherman Smith rushed for his second touchdown of the game, as the score was 48–20 for New Orleans.  The Saints Rich Szaro kicked his third field goal of the game, this time from 21 yards, as New Orleans went ahead 51–20.  Seahawks quarterback Jim Zorn had a seven-yard touchdown rush late in the game, making the final score 51–27 for the Saints.

With the loss, Seattle fell to 2–9–0.

Week 12: at New York Giants

For the twelfth week of the season, the Seahawks traveled across the country to Giants Stadium in East Rutherford, New Jersey, the Seattle faced the New York Giants, who entered the game with a 1–10–0 record.  The Seahawks opened the scoring in the first quarter when Sherman Smith had a two-yard rushing touchdown, however, the Seahawks failed in the extra point attempt and took a 6–0 lead.  Seattle stretched their lead to 9–0 by the end of the first quarter when John Leypoldt hit a 45-yard field goal.  The Giants fought back in the second quarter, as Gary Shirk caught a three-yard touchdown pass from Craig Morton, cutting the Seahawks lead to 9–7.  New York then took the lead when Gordon Bell ran for a two-yard touchdown, making the score 14–9 for the Giants at halftime.  The Giants struck again to open the scoring in the third quarter, as Gordon Bell rushed for his second touchdown of the game, this time for 21 yards, as New York took a 21–9 lead.  The Seahawks replied with their own rushing touchdown, as quarterback Jim Zorn rushed for seven yards into the Giants' end zone, cutting the New York lead to 21–16.  The Giants put the game away in the fourth quarter, as Eric Marshall caught a nine-yard touchdown reception, making the final score 28–16 for New York.

The loss dropped the Seahawks to 2–10–0 on the season.

Week 13: vs. Chicago Bears

The Seahawks final home game of the season was against the Chicago Bears, who entered the game with a 6–6–0 record.  After a scoreless first quarter, the Bears opened the scoring when Johnny Musso rushed for two yards into the Seahawks end zone, however, Chicago failed on the extra point attempt to take a 6–0 lead.  The Seahawks responded with their own touchdown, as John McMakin caught a 14-yard pass from Jim Zorn, giving Seattle a 7–6 lead at halftime.  The Bears took control of the game in the third quarter, as James Scott had a 63-yard touchdown reception, followed by a 30-yard touchdown reception, both from quarterback Bob Avellini, giving the Bears a 20–7 lead.  Before the quarter was over, Chicago took a 27–7 when Roland Harper had a 39-yard touchdown reception.  In the fourth quarter, the Bears went up 34–7 when Randy Burks caught a 55-yard pass for a touchdown from Virgil Carter, as Chicago ended the game scoring 28 unanswered points.

The loss dropped Seattle to a record of 2–11–0.

Week 14: at Philadelphia Eagles

Seattle headed on the road for the final game of the season, as they faced the Philadelphia Eagles on a cold day at Veterans Stadium.  The Eagles entered the game with a 3–10–0 record.  Philadelphia scored the lone touchdown in the first quarter, as Tom Sullivan had a four-yard rush into the Seahawks' end zone to give the Eagles a 7–0 lead.  In the second quarter, Sullivan rushed for his second touchdown, this time a one-yard rush at the goal line, as Philadelphia took a 14–0 lead.  The Seahawks got on the scoreboard when John Leypoldt connected for a 24-yard field goal, as the score was 14–3 for the Eagles at halftime.  The Eagles took a 17–3 lead in the third quarter as Horst Muhlmann had a 33-yard field goal, then Philadelphia took a 24–3 lead as Charlie Smith rushed for three yards into the Seattle end zone.  In the fourth quarter, Muhlmann had his second field goal of the game, making the score 27–3 for Philadelphia.  The Seahawks cut the lead to 27–10, as Steve Largent caught a nine-yard touchdown pass from Jim Zorn for the final score of the game.

The loss dropped the Seahawks' record to 2–12–0 for the season. It was also their last game as an NFC team for the next 26 years.

References

Sources

 Neft, David S., Cohen, Richard M., and Korch, Rick. The Complete History of Professional Football from 1892 to the Present.'' New York: St. Martin's Press. 1994 

Seattle
Seattle Seahawks seasons